Cristian Álvarez (born May 21, 1983) is a Guatemalan professional footballer who plays as a goalkeeper for C.S.D. Municipal.

External links
 

Living people
Association football goalkeepers
Guatemalan footballers
Guatemala international footballers
1983 births
C.D. Malacateco players
Comunicaciones F.C. players
C.S.D. Municipal players
2011 Copa Centroamericana players
2013 Copa Centroamericana players